Sian Reese-Williams (born 18 November 1981) is a Welsh actress, best known for playing detective Cadi John in three series of Hidden.

Early life
Reese-Williams was born in Glanamman, South Wales. She lived in Swansea until the age of 4, when her family moved to Brecon, Mid Wales, where she attended Brecon High School. She is a native Welsh speaker.

She graduated in Drama from the University of Hull and trained at the Royal Welsh College of Music & Drama. She now lives in South London.

Television
In 2008, Reese-Williams was cast to play the role of Gennie Walker in Emmerdale. The character was created by series producer Kathleen Beedles, although by the time Reese-Williams's first episode aired on 1 April 2008, Anita Turner had taken over from Beedles. She was cast in the role and started filming in the week beginning 3 March 2008.  In 2013, it was announced that Reese-Williams was to leave the soap. Her character was killed off on 25 July 2013.

In 2016, she featured in series 3 of critically acclaimed Welsh crime drama Hinterland / , playing DI Tom Matthias's love interest, Manon.

In 2017, she starred in series 3 of the BAFTA award-winning 35 Diwrnod for S4C.

A second series aired in 2019. A third and final series aired in 2022.

In January 2020, she appeared in Silent Witness as Tina Harcourt, a long time beaten wife who took revenge on the husbands & partners of other beaten women by killing some and framing others for their murders.

Reese-Williams commenced work in BBC serial hospital drama Holby City in November 2020, playing Jodie, a tea lady, who has a relationship with consultant Sacha Levy, while he is recovering from the recent death of his fiancee Essie De Lucca. Reese-Williams appeared in Vera on 29 August 2021 in the episode "Witness" in the role of Beth Draper.

Theatre
Following her stint in Emmerdale, Reese-Williams returned to theatre and in November 2013 played "Marta" in Children of Fate at the Bussey Building in Peckham.

In May/June 2014, she played 'Linda' in Alan Bennett's Enjoy at the West Yorkshire Playhouse. 

She has worked extensively with new-writing theatre Paines Plough on their Roundabout Theatre season. She starred to wide critical acclaim as W in Duncan Macmillan's Lungs, which was awarded the 2016 Manchester Theatre Award for Best Studio Production.

Filmography

Awards and nominations

References

External links

1981 births
Living people
Welsh television actresses
Welsh soap opera actresses
Welsh-speaking actors
Alumni of the Royal Welsh College of Music & Drama
Welsh musical theatre actresses
People from Glanamman
People from Brecon
21st-century Welsh actresses